The Society of Environmental Toxicology and Chemistry (SETAC) is an international environmental toxicology and environmental chemistry organization.

History
It was set up to allow interdisciplinary communication between environmental scientists around the world. It was founded in 1979 in North America.

Function
SETAC promotes environmental sciences through conducting meetings, workshops, and symposia; bestowing awards recognizing for excellence; promoting education in the field by organizing training courses and supporting students; and through its publication program. It holds meetings and events around the world. It produces two scientific journals; Environmental Toxicology and Chemistry (ET&C), which it has produced since 1982, originally yearly and then monthly from 1986; and Integrated Environmental Assessment and Management (IEAM). It also produces online books and easy to read Technical Issue Papers and Science Briefs, which are publicly available.

See also
 European Association of Geochemistry

References

1979 establishments in the United States
Chemistry societies
Environmental chemistry
Environmental toxicology
International environmental organizations
Scientific organizations established in 1979
Pensacola, Florida
Toxicology organizations